The Welsummer or Welsumer is a Dutch breed of domestic chicken. It originates in the small village of Welsum, in the eastern Netherlands. It was bred at the beginning of the twentieth century from local fowls of mixed origin: Rhode Island Reds, Barnevelders, Partridge Leghorns, Cochins, and Wyandottes. In 1922–23, steps were taken to fix a standard after the birds began to show a good deal of uniformity. The eggs were originally exported for the commercial egg trade. Some stock was exported to the United Kingdom, and the breed was added to the British Standard in 1930.

In 2001, a number of farms culled their flocks in connection with the outbreak of foot-and-mouth disease.

Characteristics 

Three plumage colours are listed for the Welsumer by the Entente Européenne d’Aviculture et de Cuniculture, of which only one, Red Partridge, is recognised in the Netherlands.

Use 

Bantam Welsumers lay about 180 dark brown eggs per year, with an average weight of

References

Chicken breeds
Chicken breeds originating in the Netherlands